The Bakken Formation is a rock unit from the Late Devonian to Early Mississippian age occupying about  of the subsurface of the Williston Basin, underlying parts of Montana, North Dakota, Saskatchewan and Manitoba. The formation was initially described by geologist J. W. Nordquist in 1953. The formation is entirely in the subsurface, and has no surface outcrop. It is named after Henry O. Bakken (1901–1982), a farmer in Tioga, North Dakota, who owned the land where the formation was initially discovered while drilling for oil.

Besides the Bakken formation being a widespread prolific source rock for oil when thermally mature, significant producible oil reserves exist within the rock unit itself. Oil was first discovered within the Bakken in 1951, but past efforts to produce it have faced technical difficulties.

Various other estimates place the total reserves, recoverable and non-recoverable with today's technology, at up to 24 billion barrels. A recent estimate places the figure at 18 billion barrels. In April 2013, the U.S. Geological Survey released a new figure for expected ultimate recovery of 7.4 billion barrels of oil.

The application of hydraulic fracturing and directional drilling technologies has caused a boom in Bakken oil production since 2000. There is some controversy over the safety of shipping this crude oil by rail due to its volatility.

This was illustrated by the 2013 Lac-Mégantic rail disaster, in which a unit train carrying 77 tank cars full of highly volatile Bakken oil through Quebec from North Dakota to the Irving Oil Refinery in New Brunswick derailed and exploded in the town centre of Lac-Mégantic. It destroyed 30 buildings (half the downtown core) and killed 47 people. The explosion was estimated to have a one-kilometre (0.62 mi) blast radius.

As of January 2015, estimates varied on the break-even oil price for drilling Bakken wells. The North Dakota Department of Natural Resources estimated overall break-even to be just below US$40 per barrel. An analyst for Wood Mackenzie said that the overall break-even price was US$62/barrel, but in high-productivity areas such as Sanish Field and Parshall Oil Field, the break-even price was US$38–US$40 per barrel.

Geology 
The rock formation consists of three members: lower shale, middle dolomite, and upper shale. The shales were deposited in relatively deep anoxic marine conditions, and the dolomite was deposited as a coastal carbonate bank during a time of shallower, well-oxygenated water. Both the upper and lower shale members are organic-rich marine shale.

Oil and gas 

The Bakken formation has emerged in recent years as one of the most important sources of new oil production in the United States. Most Bakken drilling and production has been in North Dakota, although the formation also extends into Montana and the Canadian provinces of Saskatchewan and Manitoba. As of 2013, the Bakken was the source of more than ten percent of all US oil production. By April 2014, Bakken production in North Dakota and Montana exceeded . As a result of increased production from the Bakken, and long-term production declines in Alaska and California, North Dakota as of 2014 was the second-largest oil-producing state in the US, behind only Texas in volume of oil produced.

Bakken production has also increased in Canada, although to a lesser degree than in the US, since the 2004 discovery of the Viewfield Oil Field in Saskatchewan. The same techniques of horizontal drilling and multi-stage massive hydraulic fracturing are used.

Drilling and completion 

Most Bakken wells are drilled and completed in the middle member. Many wells are now being drilled and completed in the basal Sanish/Pronghorn member and in the underlying Three Forks Formation, which the North Dakota Department of Mineral Resources treats as part of the Bakken for oil production statistical purposes.

Porosities in the Bakken averages about 5%, and permeabilities are very low, averaging 0.04 millidarcys—much lower than typical oil reservoirs, in today's terms an unconventional light tight oil play. However, the presence of vertical to sub-vertical natural fractures makes the Bakken an excellent candidate for horizontal drilling techniques in which a well is drilled horizontally along bedding planes, rather than vertically through them.

Production is also enhanced by artificially fracturing the rock, to allow oil to seep to the oil well.

Hydrogen sulfide (H2S, also known as sour gas) is found to varying degrees in crude petroleum. The gas is flammable, corrosive, poisonous, and explosive; thus, oil with higher levels of H2S presents challenges such as "health and environmental risks, corrosion of wellbore, added expense with regard to materials handling and pipeline equipment, and additional refinement requirements." Bakken oil has historically been characterized as "sweet", meaning that it has little or no H2S. However, increased concentration of H2S over time has been observed in some Bakken wells, believed to be due to certain completion practices, such as hydraulic fracturing into neighboring formations, that may contain high levels of H2S. Some other formations in the Williston Basin have always produced "sour" (high H2S) crude oil, and because sweet oil brings a higher price, oil transporters suspect that some sour oil is being blended into sweet Bakken crude. H2S in crude oil is being investigated as a possible cause of the explosive nature of the Lac-Mégantic rail disaster. Pipeline transport operator Enbridge no longer accepts crude with more than five parts per million H2S, citing safety concerns.

Increased US oil production from hydraulically fractured tight oil wells in formations such as the Bakken was mostly responsible for the decrease in US oil imports since 2005. The US imported 52% of its oil in 2011, down from 65% in 2005. Hydraulically fractured wells in the Bakken, Eagle Ford, and other tight oil targets enabled US crude oil production to rise in September 2013 to the highest output since 1989.

History of Bakken oil resource estimates

Oil in place 
While others before him had begun to realize that the oil generated by the Bakken shales had remained within the Bakken, it was Price, who had spent much of his career studying the Bakken, who particularly stressed this point. If he was right, the large amounts of oil remaining in this formation would make it a prime oil exploration target. Price died in 2000 before his research could be peer-reviewed and published. The drilling and production successes in much of the Bakken beginning with the Elm Coulee Oil Field discovery in 2000 have proven correct his claim that the oil generated by the Bakken shale was there. In April 2008, a report issued by the state of North Dakota Department of Mineral Resources estimated that the North Dakota portion of the Bakken contained  of oil in place.

Recoverable oil 
Although the amount of oil in place is a very large oil resource, the percentage that can be extracted with current technology is another matter. Estimates of the Bakken's recovery factor have ranged from as low as 1%—because the Bakken shale has generally low porosity and low permeability, making the oil difficult to extract—to Leigh Price's estimate of 50% recoverable. Reports issued by both the USGS and the state of North Dakota in April 2013 estimated up to 7.4 billion barrels of oil can be recovered from the Bakken and Three Forks formations in the Dakotas and Montana, using current technology. The flurry of drilling activity in the Bakken, coupled with the wide range of estimates of in-place and recoverable oil, led North Dakota senator Byron Dorgan to ask the USGS to conduct a study of the Bakken's potentially recoverable oil.

(Note: the recent discoveries off the coast of Brazil should be greater, with proven reserves of 30 billion, and a potential for 50 to 80.) This considerable increase has been made possible by the combined use of horizontal drilling, hydraulic fracturing, and a large number of wells drilled. While these technologies have been consistently in use since the 1980s, the Bakken trend is the place where they are being most heavily used: 150 active rigs in the play and a rate of 1,800 added wells per year.

An April 2013 estimate by the USGS projects that  of undiscovered oil can be recovered from the Bakken and Three Forks formations and 6.7 trillion cubic feet of natural gas and 530 million barrels of natural gas liquids using current technology.

The Energy Information Administration (EIA), the statistics service of the Department of Energy, estimated in 2013 that there were 1.6 billion barrels and 2.2 trillion cubic feet (tcf) of technically recoverable oil and natural gas in the Canadian portion of the Bakken formation. Crescent Point Energy and other operators are implementing waterfloods in the Bakken Formation of the Viewfield Oil Field in Saskatchewan. Some believe that waterflooding can raise the recovery factor at Viewfield from 19 percent to more than 30 percent, adding 1.5 to two billion barrels of additional oil.

Proved reserves 
The US EIA reported that proved reserves in the Bakken/Three Forks were 2.00 billion barrels of oil as of 2011.

History of Bakken oil 

The Bakken formation has produced oil since 1953, when the #1 Woodrow Starr was completed in North Dakota by Stanolind Oil and Gas.

Southwest pinch-out 
A major advance in extracting oil from the Bakken came in 1995, when geologist Dick Findley realized that the dolomitic Middle member of the Bakken Formation was a better exploration target than the upper or lower members. Although the middle member held less oil in place than the organic shales both above and below, it was able to maintain open fractures more than the shales. Horizontal wells in the middle Bakken were used successfully to develop the Elm Coulee Field in Montana.

The 2000 discovery of the Elm Coulee Oil Field, Richland County, Montana, where production is expected to ultimately total , drew a great deal of attention to the trend where oil was trapped along the Bakken pinchout. In 2007, production from Elm Coulee averaged  — more than the entire state of Montana a few years earlier. The Mondak Field to the southeast of Elm Coulee extended the productive pinchout trend into North Dakota. Elm Coulee was key to later Bakken development because it combined horizontal wells and hydraulic fracturing, and targeted the dolomitic middle Bakken member rather than the shales of the upper or lower Bakken.

East side trap

New interest developed in 2006 when EOG Resources reported that a single well it had drilled into an oil-rich layer of shale near Parshall, North Dakota, was anticipated to produce  of oil. At Parshall, the abrupt eastern limit of the field is formed by the extent of thermally mature Bakken shale; shale farther east is thermally immature, and unproductive.

The Parshall Oil Field discovery, combined with other factors, including an oil-drilling tax break enacted by the state of North Dakota in 2007, shifted attention in the Bakken from Montana to the North Dakota side. The number of wells drilled in the North Dakota Bakken jumped from 300 in 2006
to 457 in 2007.

The viability of the play in North Dakota west of the Nesson Anticline was uncertain until 2009, when Brigham Oil & Gas achieved success with larger hydraulic fracturing treatments, with 25 or more stages.

According to the North Dakota Department of Mineral Resources, daily oil production per well reached a plateau at 145 barrels in June 2010. Although the number of wells tripled between June 2010 and December 2012, oil production per well remained essentially unchanged. However, as more wells were brought online, total oil produced continued to increase until it peaked in mid-2015 at 1.15 million barrels per day. The increase ended because of a slow decline in daily production per well that began in 2013, down to 115 barrels in mid-2015. The peak production value reported by the EIA is about 9% larger. The EIA also reports that the Bakken rig count dropped about 60% over the year ending in October 2015 in response to the collapsing price of oil, while the new-well (initial) oil production per rig increased by 40%, both apparently plateauing at that time. (The production rate from fracked wells decreases more rapidly than from conventional wells drilled in more permeable rock.)

Exploration and production 
Several public companies have drilling rigs in the Bakken trend. These include EOG Resources, Continental Resources, Chord Energy, Marathon Oil Corporation, Diamondback Energy, and Hess Corporation. In Canada, operators include Ridgeback Resources, and Crescent Point Energy. LIG Assets, Inc. elected to participate in a 10% industry position in a group of oil leases located in the Bakken formation in North Dakota.

Some companies have sold assets in the Bakken, in favor of exploring the Permian Basin in Texas, due in part to the higher cost of transport to major markets closer to tidewater with inexpensive access to foreign oil.

Oil extraction in Bakken field declined by around 20% from mid-2015 to mid-2016 and then remained rather stable until mid-2017.

Worker safety versus productivity 
With the persistently low price of oil in 2015, there was pressure on rigs to maximize drilling speed, with associated additional risks to the crews.  It was reported that on average, an oil worker died in the Bakken every six weeks. One company offered workers daily bonuses of $150 for drilling quickly, while those who proceeded more slowly, exercising caution, were offered only $40 a day. The well owner may avoid liability for accidents if the blame can be assigned to the rig subcontractor. Statutes have been established to prevent this in four other oil-producing states: Texas, Louisiana, New Mexico and Wyoming.

Oil and gas infrastructure
The great increases in oil and gas production have exceeded the area's pipeline capacity to transport hydrocarbons to markets. There is only one refinery in the area. As a result, the oil and gas prices received have been much lower than the normal North American index prices of West Texas Intermediate for oil and Henry Hub for gas.

The shortage of pipeline capacity has caused some producers to ship oil out of the area by more expensive methods of truck or railroad. It was Bakken crude oil carried by train that caught fire in the deadly 2013 Lac-Mégantic rail disaster in Quebec. Part of the disaster at Lac-Mégantic has been blamed on the fact that much of the highly volatile Bakken oil was mislabeled as lower risk oil and was being shipped in substandard tank cars not designed to contain it. Because of the shortage of pipeline capacity out of North Dakota, over half of its production is sent to market by rail. BNSF Railway and Canadian Pacific Railway reported to Minnesota officials that about 50 Bakken oil trains pass through the state each week, mostly through the Twin Cities of Minneapolis–Saint Paul. At least 15 major accidents involving crude oil or ethanol trains have occurred in the United States and Canada since 2006, and most small cities such as Lac-Megantic are not prepared for oil train explosions and fires.

In March 2013, Canadian pipeline company Enbridge completed a pipeline to take North Dakota oil north into Canada, where it hooks up to Enbridge's main pipeline delivering western Canadian oil to refineries in the American Midwest. Unlike the rejected cross-border Keystone XL Pipeline, the pipeline project to carry American crude across the border was approved by the US government without controversy.

Absent the infrastructure to produce and export natural gas, it is merely burned on the spot; a 2013 study estimated the cost at $100 million per month.

Effects of the boom 
The North Dakota oil boom has given those who own mineral rights large incomes from lease bonuses and royalties. The boom has reduced unemployment and given the state of North Dakota a billion-dollar budget surplus. North Dakota, which ranked 38th in per capita gross domestic product (GDP) in 2001, rose steadily with the Bakken boom, and now has per capita GDP 29% above the national average.

The industrialization and population boom has put a strain on water supplies, sewage systems, available housing and government services of the small towns and ranches in the area.

Increasing economic prosperity has also brought increasing crime and social problems.

See also 
 Double H Pipeline
 Pony Express Pipeline
 Dakota Access Pipeline

References

External links 

 Geology.Com: Bakken formation, accessed 4 March 2009
 US Geological Survey: Assessment of undiscovered oil resources in the Devonian-Mississippian Bakken Formation, PDF file, retrieved 4 March 2009
 Boom! Behind the Bakken Documentary produced by Montana PBS
 Three tiers of US shale plays

Geologic formations of Montana
Geologic formations of North Dakota
Geologic formations of Saskatchewan
Devonian System of North America
Devonian Montana
Devonian North Dakota
Devonian Saskatchewan
Mississippian Series
Mississippian United States
Dolomite formations
Shale formations
Shale formations of the United States
Deep marine deposits
Shallow marine deposits
Source rock formations
Western Canadian Sedimentary Basin
Oil-bearing shales in Canada
Oil-bearing shales in the United States
Oil fields in North Dakota